These are the Billboard Hot Dance/Disco Club Play and Maxi-Singles Sales number-one hits of 2001.

See also
2001 in music
List of number-one dance hits (United States)
List of artists who reached number one on the U.S. Dance chart

References

2001
United States Dance Singles
2001 in American music